Pyrausta pastrinalis is a moth of the family Crambidae. The species was described by Achille Guenée in 1862. It is endemic to Réunion, where it is common at low and medium altitudes.

See also
 List of moths of Réunion

References

External links

Moths described in 1862
Lepidoptera of Réunion
pastrinalis
Moths of Africa